Niamh Blackshaw (born 19 November 1999) is an English actress. She began her career appearing in television advertisements which included a national advertisement for Mr Kipling. She was then cast in the guest role of Lara Cutler in the ITV soap opera Coronation Street in 2017. Since 2018, she has portrayed the role of Juliet Nightingale in the Channel 4 soap opera Hollyoaks, for which she received a nomination for Best Newcomer at the Inside Soap Awards.

Early and personal life
Prior to studying acting, Blackshaw trained as a dancer, and at the age of eleven, she began attending Rossendale Dance and Drama Centre, where she completed her LAMDA and Trinity exams. She also attended Canon Slade School in Bolton, where she studied Latin for her A-Level exams, amongst other subjects. Blackshaw was interested in attending Cambridge University, until she pursued acting as a career. Blackshaw has Lyme disease.

Career
Blackshaw began her acting career appearing in television advertisements, including an advert for Mr Kipling. In 2017, she appeared in five episodes of the ITV soap opera Coronation Street as Lara Cutler. Her character committed suicide after being groomed by Nathan Curtis (Christopher Harper) and his gang. In March 2018, she made an appearance in the short film Landline. On 4 September 2018, it was announced that she would be joining the Channel 4 soap opera Hollyoaks as Juliet Nightingale, and she made her first appearance on 21 November 2018. Her storylines in the soap have included discovering her father is Mac Nightingale (David Easter), being groomed into a county lines drug trafficking gang, coming out as a lesbian and developing a romance with Peri Lomax (Ruby O'Donnell). For her portrayal of Juliet, she has been nominated for Best Newcomer at the Inside Soap Awards, as well as two nominations for Best Partnership alongside Lysette Anthony and O'Donnell.

Filmography

Awards and nominations

References

External links
 

21st-century English actresses
Actresses from Manchester
English soap opera actresses
English people of Irish descent
English child actresses
Living people
Actors from Bolton
People from the Borough of Rossendale
Year of birth missing (living people)